The 2014 Western Illinois Leathernecks football team represented Western Illinois University in the 2014 NCAA Division I FCS football season. They were led by second year head coach Bob Nielson and played their home games at Hanson Field. They were a member of the Missouri Valley Football Conference. They finished the season 5–7, 3–5 in MVFC play to finish in a tie for seventh place.

The team gave up the quickest score in the history of college football. In the opening kickoff against the Wisconsin Badgers, the kick returner stepped out of the end zone before returning and taking a knee the end zone for a safety. One second had elapsed off the clock.

Schedule

Source: Schedule

Roster

References

Western Illinois
Western Illinois Leathernecks football seasons
Western Illinois Leathernecks football